Phyllariaceae is a family of brown algae in the order Tilopteridales.

Genera
A 2014 classification recognizes the following genera in the family:
Genus Phyllariopsis E.C.Henry & G.R.South, 1987
Species Phyllariopsis brevipes (C.Agardh) E.C.Henry & G.R.South, 1987
Species Phyllariopsis purpurascens (C.Agardh) E.C.Henry & G.R.South, 1987
GenusSaccorhiza Bachelot de la Pylaie, 1830
Species Saccorhiza dermatodea (Bachelot de la Pylaie) J.Agardh, 1868
Species Saccorhiza polyschides (Lightfoot) Batters, 1902

References

Brown algae families
Tilopteridales